Albert Victor William Percy Hill (20 February 1885 – 10 August 1940) was an English footballer who played in the Football League for Everton and Manchester City.

References

1885 births
1940 deaths
English footballers
Association football defenders
English Football League players
Footballers from Wiltshire
People from Wilton, Wiltshire
Everton F.C. players
Manchester City F.C. players
Airdrieonians F.C. (1878) players
Scottish Football League players
Swindon Town F.C. players
Weymouth F.C. players
Southampton F.C. players